The 2012 Michigan Wolverines men's soccer team was the college's 13th season of playing organized men's college soccer. It was the Wolverines' 13th season playing in the Big Ten Conference.

Background 
In the 2011 regular season Michigan went 5–14–1 with a conference record of 1–5–0. In the Big Ten Tournament Michigan lost to Wisconsin in the quarterfinals. The team did not advance to the NCAA Tournament.

Roster

Competitions

Regular season

Big Ten Tournament

NCAA Tournament

Statistics

Transfers

See also 
2012 Big Ten Conference men's soccer season
2012 Big Ten Conference Men's Soccer Tournament
2012 NCAA Division I Men's Soccer Championship

References 

Michigan Wolverines
Michigan Wolverines men's soccer seasons
Michigan Wolverines, Soccer
Michigan Wolverines
Michigan Wolverines